Victoria amazonica also called Victoria regia  is a species of flowering plant, the second largest in the water lily family Nymphaeaceae. It is called Uape Jacana ("The Lilytrotter's Waterlily") in Brazil and its Inca (Quechua) name is Atun Sisac ("great flower"). Its native region is tropical South America, specifically Guyana and the Amazon Basin.

Description
These leaves are enormously buoyant if the weight is distributed evenly over the entire surface of the leaf (as by a piece of  plywood, which should be of neutral buoyancy). In 1896 a V. amazonica leaf at Tower Grove Park, Saint Louis, Missouri bore the "unprecedented" weight of 250 pounds (113.6 kg). However, in 1867  William Sowerby of Regents Park Botanic Garden in London placed 426 pounds (193.9 kg) on a leaf only 5' 6" (168 cm) in diameter. One leaf of a specimen  grown in Ghent, Belgium bore a load of 498 pounds (226 kg)                           It is the second-largest waterlily in the world. V. amazonica is native to the shallow waters of the Amazon River basin, such as oxbow lakes (called iguarapes) and bayous (called paranas). In their native habitat, the flowers first begin to open as the sun starts to set and can take up to 48 hours to fully open. These flowers can grow up to 40 cm (16 in) in diameter. All of the flowers of  one particular plant will, on a given evening,  all be in the female phase or all in the male phase, so that pollination must be by a different individual, precluding self-pollination.

Each plant continues to produce flowers for a full growing season, and they have co-evolved a mutualistic relationship with a species of scarab beetle of the genus Cyclocephala as a pollinator.  All the buds in a single patch will begin to open at the same time and as they do, they give off a fruity smell. At this point the flower petals are white, and the beetles are attracted both to the colour and the smell of the flower. At nightfall the flower stops producing the odor, and it closes, trapping the beetles inside its carpellary appendages. Here, the stamens are protected by the paracarpels and for the next day the flower continues to remain closed. The cavity in which the beetle is trapped is composed of a spongy, starchy tissue that provides nourishment for the beetle. During this time, anthocyanins start to be released by the plant, which in turn changes the petals from white to a reddish pink colour, a sign that the flower will have been pollinated. As the beetle munches away inside the flower, the stamens fall inward and the anthers, which have already fallen, drop pollen on the stamens. During the evening of the second day, the flowers will have opened enough to release the beetle, and as it pushes its way through the stamens it becomes covered in pollen. These insects will then go on to find a newly opened water lily and pollinate with the pollen they are carrying from the previous flower. This process was described in detail by Sir Ghillean Prance and Jorge Arius.  

The stem and underside of the leaves are coated with many small spines to defend itself from fish and other herbivores that dwell underwater, although they can also play an offensive role in crushing rival plants in the vicinity as the lily unfolds as it aggressively seeks and hogs sunlight, depriving other plants directly beneath its leaves of such vital resource and significantly darkening the waters below.  Younger giant water lilies are even known to swing their spiny stalks and buds around as they grow to forcibly make space for themselves.

It is depicted in the Guyanese coat of arms. They can hold 140 pounds and are capable of holding a small child or even a full-grown adult.

Classification

The species is a member of the genus Victoria, placed in the family Nymphaeaceae or sometimes in the Euryalaceae. The first published description of the genus was by John Lindley in October 1837, based on specimens of this plant returned from British Guiana by Robert Schomburgk. Lindley named the genus after the newly ascended Queen Victoria, and the species Victoria regia. The spelling in Schomburgk's description in Athenaeum, published the month before, was given as Victoria Regina.  Despite this spelling being adopted by the Botanical Society of London for their new emblem, Lindley's was the version used throughout the 19th century.

An earlier account of the species, Euryale amazonica by Eduard Friedrich Poeppig, in 1832 described an affinity with Euryale ferox. A collection and description was also made by the French botanist Aimé Bonpland in 1825. In 1850 James De Carle Sowerby recognized Poeppig's earlier description and transferred its epithet amazonica. The new name was rejected by Lindley. The current name, Victoria amazonica, did not come into widespread use until the 20th century.

History

Victoria regia, as it was named, was described by Tadeáš Haenke in 1801. It was once the subject of rivalry between Victorian gardeners in England. Always on the lookout for a spectacular new species with which to impress their peers, Victorian “gardeners” such as the Duke of Devonshire and the Duke of Northumberland started a well-mannered competition to become the first to cultivate and bring to flower this enormous lily. In the end, the two aforementioned dukes became the first to achieve this, Joseph Paxton (for the Duke of Devonshire) being the first in November 1849 by replicating the lily's warm swampy habitat (not easy in winter in England with only coal-fired boilers for heating), and a “Mr Ivison” the second and more constantly successful (for Northumberland) at Syon House.

The species captured the imagination of the public and was the subject of several dedicated monographs. The botanical illustrations of cultivated specimens in Fitch and W.J. Hooker's 1851 work Victoria Regia received critical acclaim in the Athenaeum, “they are accurate, and they are beautiful”. “The Duke of Devonshire presented Queen Victoria with one of the first of these flowers and named it in her honour. The lily, with ribbed undersurface and leaves veining “li” e transverse girders and supports”, “as Paxton's inspiration for The Crystal Palace, a building four times the size of St. Peter's in Rome.”

Gallery

References

External links
 
 

Nymphaeaceae
Aquatic plants
Flora of the Amazon
Flora of Brazil
National symbols of Guyana
Flora of Guyana
Flora of Peru
Plants described in 1836
Garden plants of South America
Cultural depictions of Queen Victoria
Taxa named by Eduard Friedrich Poeppig